Anseba Sport Club is an Eritrea football club based in Keren, Eritrea.

Achievements
Eritrean Premier League: 1
2003

Performance in CAF competitions
CAF Champions League: 1 appearance
2004 – Preliminary Round

External links
Team profile – leballonrond.fr

Football clubs in Eritrea
Keren, Eritrea